Christopher Lloyd, known professionally as Choker, is an American singer-songwriter, rapper and record producer. Known for his eclecticism, his coded lyricism and his falsetto laced vocals. Choker has gained acclaim for blending genres and subgenres of R&B, rap, soul and psychedelic rock, and wide comparisons to Frank Ocean because of his musical style. His stage name stems from the energy and mystique surrounding old metal acts. In 2017, Choker was listed by Complex as one of the best new artistes.

Early life 
Choker was born in Detroit, Michigan and grew up there. Growing up, he was quite isolated spending his time at home reading and researching stuffs. At a young age he enrolled into filmmaking and spent most of his time writing scripts which later transitioned from poetry to lyric writing.

Career 
Choker began his career as a record producer at aged 18, learning on his own by watching YouTube tutorials and started singing at aged 19. In 2017, he released his self-produced 10-track debut studio album, Peak. The following year, he released a 14-track R&B album Honeybloom which contained elements from rap, pop and soul and has amassed over 45 million streams on Spotify. In 2019, he released 3 Extended plays "Mono No Moto" a 3-track set, followed by "Dog Candy" and "Forever & A Few". Since then Choker has toured across Europe, United States and Canada.

References

External links 

 Choker at AllMusic

Living people
American singer-songwriters
American rappers
American record producers
American rhythm and blues musicians
Rappers from Detroit
Year of birth missing (living people)